The Aegean Region (Turkish: Ege Bölgesi) (TR3) is a statistical region in Turkey.

Subregions and provinces 

 İzmir Subregion (TR31)
 İzmir Province (TR310)
 Aydın Subregion (TR32)
 Aydın Province (TR321)
 Denizli Province (TR322)
 Muğla Province (TR323)
 Manisa Subregion (TR33)
 Manisa Province (TR331)
 Afyonkarahisar Province (TR332)
 Kütahya Province (TR333)
 Uşak Province (TR334)

Age groups

Internal immigration

State register location of Aegean residents

Marital status of 15+ population by gender

Education status of 15+ population by gender

See also 
 NUTS of Turkey

References

Sources 
 ESPON Database

External links 
 TURKSTAT 

Statistical regions of Turkey